Paramorsimus is a genus of Asian bush-crickets in the tribe Phyllomimini and the subfamily Pseudophyllinae.  Species have been recorded (probably incompletely) from India, Indochina (Vietnam) and Malesia.

Species
The Orthoptera Species File lists:
Paramorsimus acutelaminatus Brunner von Wattenwyl, 1895
Paramorsimus confinis Brunner von Wattenwyl, 1895
Paramorsimus fruhstorferi Beier, 1954
Paramorsimus maculifolius Pictet & Saussure, 1892
Paramorsimus obliquevenosus Brunner von Wattenwyl, 1895
Paramorsimus oleifolius (Fabricius, 1793)type species (as Locusta oleifolia Fabricius)
Paramorsimus robustus Brunner von Wattenwyl, 1895

References

External links
 

Tettigoniidae genera
Pseudophyllinae
Orthoptera of Indo-China
Orthoptera of Malesia